5-Iodo-2-aminoindane (5-IAI) is a drug which acts as a releasing agent of serotonin, norepinephrine, and dopamine. It was developed in the 1990s by a team led by David E. Nichols at Purdue University. 5-IAI fully substitutes for MDMA in rodents and is a putative entactogen in humans. Unlike related aminoindane derivatives like MDAI and MMAI, 5-IAI causes some serotonergic neurotoxicity in rats, but is substantially less toxic than its corresponding amphetamine homologue pIA, with the damage observed barely reaching statistical significance.

Legal status 

Sweden's public health agency suggested classifying 5-IAI as a hazardous substance, on September 25, 2019.

References 

2-Aminoindanes
Entactogens and empathogens
Serotonin-norepinephrine-dopamine releasing agents
Stimulants